Tommy Banks (born 1989) is a British Michelin Star head chef. He owns Michelin-starred The Black Swan at Oldstead, Roots in York, and the premium food box business Made In Oldstead.

Early life 
Banks was born and raised in the small North Yorkshire village of Oldstead. He grew up there with his older brother, James, and parents, Tom and Anne Banks.

Banks comes from a farming background, with the Banks family farming in and around Oldstead for five generations. The Banks family also ran a B&B from their family home before buying their local pub, The Black Swan, in 2006.

Cooking and the hospitality industry was never at the forefront of Bank's mind when he was younger. His ambition was to play cricket professionally, leaving school during his A-Levels to play the sport six days a week, alongside working in his parents' pub. Unfortunately, when he was 18 years old, Banks developed ulcerative colitis. He underwent three major operations and was subsequently bedridden for 18 months. It was during this time that he began reading a lot of cookbooks and watching cookery programmes, giving him a newfound passion for food, and returning to work more determined and grounded.

Career
In 2006, when he was 17, Banks's parents bought the pub and restaurant The Black Swan at Oldstead, and he became involved in the running of the business. He worked in the kitchen and started to learn to cook. He had no formal training as chef, but worked several unpaid stages in Michelin-starred restaurants including a week spent in Raymond Blanc's restaurant in Oxfordshire, Le Manoir aux Quat'Saisons.

The restaurant at The Black Swan first won a Michelin Star in 2012 with Adam Jackson as chef. When Jackson left to set up his own restaurant in June 2013, Banks took over as head chef at The Black Swan. At the age of 24, Banks was the youngest chef to receive a Michelin Star when the restaurant retained its Michelin Star that year.

In 2013 the family developed a three-acre kitchen garden in the field next to the restaurant. Having the garden allowed the Banks to grow food that was unique to them and allowed them to be able to serve ingredients that can not be procured elsewhere; examples being Crapaudine beetroot, Black Truffe potatoes and Wineberries.

On 5 April 2018 Banks's debut cookbook 'Roots' was published by The Orion Publishing Group and it was the UK winner of the Gourmand World Cookbook Awards in the Chef category 2018.

On 15 September 2018 Banks and his close friend and business partner Matthew Lockwood opened the Banks's second restaurant, Roots, in the centre of York. The restaurant is a tasting menu format, which also uses produce, grown in the garden and on the farm, which is transported to the city on a daily basis.

In March 2020 Banks and Lockwood launched Made In Oldstead, a premium food box delivery service. This was launched primarily to help pay suppliers and staff unable to be furloughed after the temporary closure of their restaurants due to COVID-19. However, in July 2020, they announced that the food boxes will remain a permanent fixture to the business, delivering three and five-course menus to homes across the UK.

Television
In 2016, Banks took part in Great British Menu. In the final, he won the fish course with a dish entitled 'Preserving The Future'. He also appeared in the programme in 2017 and again won with his fish course of turbot with strawberries and cream.

Banks was co-host of The Big Family Cooking Showdown with Angellica Bell in 2018. He regularly appears on Saturday Kitchen and Sunday Brunch as a guest chef. Since 2019, Banks has been a veteran guest judge for Great British Menu. In 2019 he judged the Northern Ireland heats which was won by Chris McClurg, and in 2020 he judged the London and South East heats, won by Kerth Gumbs.

In 2020, Tommy participated in the Great British Menu Christmas special, winning the petit four-course titled 'Twas the Night Before Christmas.'

References

External links 
 

British chefs
Living people
1989 births
People from Ryedale (district)
Head chefs of Michelin starred restaurants